Philadelphia Cream Cheese is a brand of cream cheese. It is one of the best selling brands of cream cheese worldwide, first produced in 1872 and is currently owned by Kraft Heinz.

Origin 
Despite its name, Philadelphia Cream Cheese was invented in New York State, not Philadelphia. In 1872 William Lawrence, a dairyman from Chester, New York, attempted to make Neufchâtel, a tangy, crumblier cheese product that was popular in Europe at the time. Instead he accidentally added an excessive amount of cream and created a richer, more spreadable cheese, which would eventually be called "cream cheese". It was not marketed as "Philadelphia Cream Cheese" until 1880. That year, Lawrence partnered with A.L. Reynolds, a cheese distributor in New York to sell larger quantities of cream cheese. At the time, Philadelphia, PA, and the surrounding area had a reputation for its high-quality dairy farms and creamier cheese products, so they decided to use the name "Philadelphia" on the foil-wrapped blocks of their cream cheese. The company went through some changes over the years and the trademarked Philadelphia name was sold to the Phenix Cheese Company in South Edmeston, New York. In 1928, Phenix merged with Kraft to form the Kraft-Phenix Cheese Company.  Philadelphia Cream Cheese has remained a staple product in the average household and in many eateries and bagel shops worldwide.

Products
Philadelphia is best known for its plain cream cheese spread as well as its various other flavors. Aside from cream cheese spreads, the brand also sells dips and ready-to-eat desserts. A list of products below (some served in different sized tub containers and brick-shaped packages):

Spreads

Original Cream Cheese (plain cream cheese)
Reduced Fat Cream Cheese
Garden Vegetable Cream Cheese
Chive & Onion Cream Cheese
Blueberry Cream Cheese
Original Whipped Cream Cheese
Strawberry Cream Cheese
Pumpkin Spice Cream Cheese
Honey Pecan Cream Cheese
Garlic & Herb Cream Cheese
Smoked Salmon Cream Cheese
Spicy Jalapeno Cream Cheese
Pineapple Cream Cheese
Mixed Berry Whipped Cream Cheese
Bacon Cream Cheese
Peach Cream Cheese
Olive with Red Bell Pepper Cream Cheese
Milk Chocolate Cream Cheese
Caramel White Chocolate Limited Edition Cream Cheese

Snacks
Cheesecake Crumble Original Cheesecake Desserts with Graham Crumble
Jalapeno Cheddar Cream Cheese Dip with Tortilla Chips
Spinach & Artichoke Cream Cheese Dip with Pita Chips
Key Lime Cheesecake Snacks

References

External links

 

Cream cheeses
Kraft Foods brands
1872 introductions